The Society for Applied Spectroscopy (SAS) is an organization promoting research and education in the fields of spectroscopy, optics, and analytical chemistry. Founded in 1958, it is currently headquartered in Frederick, MD. In 2006 it had about 2,000 members worldwide.

SAS is perhaps best known for its technical conference with the Federation of Analytical Chemistry and Spectroscopy Societies and short courses on various aspects of spectroscopy and data analysis. The society publishes the scientific journal Applied Spectroscopy.

SAS is affiliated with American Institute of Physics (AIP), Coblentz, Council for Near Infrared Spectroscopy (CNIRS), Federation of Analytical Chemistry and Spectroscopy Societies (FACSS), The Instrumentation, Systems, and Automation Society (ISA), and Optical Society of America (OSA).

SAS provides a number of awards with honorariums to encourage and recognize outstanding achievements.

See also 

 Spectroscopy
  American Institute of Physics (AIP)
 The Instrumentation, Systems, and Automation Society (ISA)
  Optical Society of America (OSA)

References

External links 
 
 Coblentz
 Council for Near Infrared Spectroscopy (CNIRS)
 Federation of Analytical Chemistry and Spectroscopy Societies (FACSS)

Scientific societies based in the United States
Spectroscopy
Analytical chemistry